The Very Best Day is a Russian comedy film directed by Zhora Kryzhovnikov. It is the highest-grossing Russian film of 2015, which raised more than $10.5 million at the box office.

Plot
The Provincial Road Officer Petya Vasyutin (Dmitry Nagiev) is going to marry his beloved girl Ole (Yuliya Aleksandrova), but succumbs to the splendor of the capital's pop star Alina Shyopot (Olga Seryabkina). Having got to him drunk at the wheel, she decides to seduce Petya to avoid punishment. Having lost his fiancée, Vasyutin for a long time tries to correct his mistakes and return his beloved.

Cast
 Dmitry Nagiev as Petya Vasyutin 
 Olga Seryabkina as Alina Shyopot 
 Yuliya Aleksandrova as Olya, Petya's girlfriend
 Sergey Lavygin as Valentin
 Inna Churikova as Lyubov Vasyutina, Petya's mother
 Mikhail Boyarsky as Gennady Vasyutin
 Elena Yakovleva as Tatyana,  Olya's mother
 Vladislav Vetrov as Vikenty Mikhailovich 
 Yan Tsapnik as Head of road police
 Andrey Malakhov as cameo

Awards and nominations 
Golden Eagle Awards 2017
Elena Yakovleva — Best Supporting Actress (won)
Nika Awards 2017
Mikhail Boyarsky — Best Supporting Actor (nominated)

References

External links 
 

2015 films
2010s musical comedy films
Russian musical comedy films
Russian films based on plays